Archer Hotels are a group of branded hotels in the United States owned by LodgeWorks Partners LP.

History
Archer Hotels are owned by LodgeWorks Partners LP, a hotel development and management firm based in Wichita, Kansas. The first Archer Hotel was built in New York City's Garment District at 45 W. 38th Street and open to the public on May 28, 2014. The building has 22 stories and was designed by Peter Poon Architects. The rooms were designed by Glen Coben of Glen & Co. Architecture.

Archer Hotels have locations in New York City, New York; Austin, Texas; Napa, California; Burlington, Massachusetts; Florham Park, New Jersey; and Redmond, Washington.

Archer persona
LodgeWorks created the Archer brand with Phillips + Co and 50,000 feet, a design firm. The company describes Archer as a "persona" and a design concept that is present in each Archer location.

References

External links
Official Website
Country Inn & Suites

Hotel affiliation groups
Hotel chains in the United States
Companies based in Wichita, Kansas